Samsung DeX (stylized as SΛMSUNG DeX) is a feature included on some high-end Samsung handheld devices that enables users to extend their device into a desktop-like experience by connecting a keyboard, mouse, and monitor. The name "DeX" is a contraction of "Desktop eXperience".

Samsung first included the DeX feature on Samsung's Galaxy S8 and S8+ smartphones, and has continued to support the feature on all of its latest flagship smartphones, including the Galaxy S9, S10, S20, S21, S22, S23, Note8, Note9 and Note10 series and Note20 series. The Galaxy A90 5G is the first Galaxy A phone with DeX support. It has also been introduced on several high-end tablets, including the Galaxy Tab S4, S5e, Tab S6, Tab S6 Lite, Tab S7 FE, Tab S7 and S7+.

History 
In 2017, the original version of DeX was released, which required the use of a proprietary docking accessory called the DeX Station. This provided a USB-C port, ethernet, HDMI 2.0 output and two USB 2.0 ports.

In August 2018 with the launch of the Note 9, Samsung introduced the DeX HDMI adapter (USB-C to female HDMI), DeX cable (USB-C to male HDMI) and DeX multiport adapter, which whilst still proprietary and containing active electronics, eliminated the need for the previous docking accessories. This design enabled the cell phone to lie flat and function as a touchpad or even continue being used as a phone in its usual fashion whilst being connected to a display and with DeX operating.

Also in 2018, Samsung released the DeX PAD.  This provided a USB-C port, HDMI and two USB ports. This design enabled the cell phone to lay flat and function as a touchpad or even continue being used as a phone in its usual fashion whilst being connected to a display and with DeX operating.

Since 2019, with the Note 10 and Galaxy Fold, DeX can now be launched via a direct cable connection to a physical computer using the existing provided charging cable or any similar off-the-shelf USB-C cable with data transfer, eliminating the need for any proprietary docking accessories.

DeX has also been used in the public safety setting to replace in-vehicle laptops.

Samsung also announced "Linux on Galaxy" (since renamed to "Linux on DeX") which allows use of a compatible Linux distribution rather than the default Android OS giving full personal computer capabilities.

The DeX Desktop can also be accessed with a downloadable app for Windows and macOS or through third party accessories. Users are able to connect to their mobile devices with a USB Cable. As of April 2022, MacOS and Windows 7 are no longer supported.

Samsung DeX devices can be managed by Samsung Knox (3.3 and higher) to allow or restrict access using the Knox platform for added control and security.

In October 2019 Samsung announced that Linux on DeX will not be available for Android 10 and warned users that after upgrade to Android 10 they will not be able to downgrade back, permanently losing the ability to use full Linux applications.

In 2020, wireless Dex was introduced, enabling Note 9 and newer phones to use MiraCast to project the desktop experience to a PC previously connected via USB or a wireless monitor/TV.
A few manufacturers (NexDock, HP, UPerfect and others) have created “LapDocks”, which are essentially laptop shells with no CPU, RAM, Disk or OS. They function as an external monitor, keyboard and trackpad while supplying power to the phone.

See also 
 Webtop, a similar feature of the Motorola Atrix series from the early 2010s, which required specialized hardware.
 Ready For, a feature of some high-end Motorola phones that includes a desktop mode as well as TV, Video Chat and Game modes.
 Easy Projection, a similar desktop mode found on the Huawei Mate 10, Mate 20 and Huawei Mate 30 phones
 Screen+, a similar desktop environment mode found on the LG Velvet and V60 phones.
 Docking station

References

External links 
 "Samsung DeX: Device Multitasking" (Samsung.com)
 Samsung DeX support page

Docking stations
Mobile/desktop convergence